Antonio José de Sucre Airport  is a commercial airport serving Cumaná, the capital of Sucre state in Venezuela.

The Cumana VOR-DME (Ident: CUM) is located on the field.

Airlines and destinations

See also
Transport in Venezuela
List of airports in Venezuela

References

External links
OurAirports - Cumaná
OpenStreetMap - Cumaná
SkyVector - Cumaná

Airports in Venezuela
Buildings and structures in Sucre (state)
Cumaná